ARCT-021, also known as LUNAR-COV19, is a COVID-19 vaccine candidate developed by Arcturus Therapeutics.

Medical uses 
It requires the intramuscular injection with a single dose.

Pharmacology 
ARCT-021 is an mRNA vaccine.

History 
Arcturus Therapeutics partnered with Singapore's Duke–NUS Medical School to develop a COVID-19 vaccine. The company also partnered with Catalent, a contract development and manufacturing organization, to manufacture multiple batches of Arcturus' COVID-19 mRNA vaccine candidate.

Clinical trials 
LUNAR-COV19 clinical trials in humans began in July 2020. On 4 January 2021, Arcturus Therapeutics started Phase-2 clinical trials.

Economics 
Arcturus has entered into development and supply agreements with the Economic Development Board of Singapore and supply agreements with the Israel Ministry of Health for LUNAR-COV19.

References

External links 

Clinical trials
American COVID-19 vaccines
Singaporean COVID-19 vaccines
RNA vaccines
2020 in medicine